The Central/North Black Forest Nature Park is located in Baden-Württemberg in Germany. It covers an area of 3,750 km2 and was founded in December 2000. As of 2018, it is the third-largest nature park in Germany.

In 2014, the Black Forest National Park opened within the Central/North Black Forest Nature Park.

Location 
It is a maximum of 90 km from north to south and 65 km wide and covers the counties of Calw, Freudenstadt, Karlsruhe, Rastatt, Rottweil, Enzkreis, Ortenaukreis, Baden-Baden and Pforzheim with 105 municipalities in which around 700,000 people live. The Black Forest National Park is located within the nature park. To the south, it is adjoined by the Southern Black Forest Nature Park.

Nature and landscape 

The Central/North Black Forest Nature Park is characterised by its deeply incised valleys, rock outcrops, streams, meadows and pastures. Geology and climate as well as centuries of human interference have created the Black Forest landscape which alternates between natural countryside and an agricultural cultural landscape.

Especially valuable habitats, with a large number of endangered animal and plant species, are also part of the scenery within the nature park: 
 Bogs and carrs
 Tarns – the dark eyes of the Black Forest
 Grinden – open heathland on the mountain kuppen formed by centuries of grazing

The variety of habitats is partly due to the very special climate of the Black Forest. Whilst in the vineyards of the foothill zone, it is almost Mediterranean, visitors to highlands, such as the Hornisgrinde, feel almost as if they are in Scandinavia. But this is compensated for in good weather by splendid views of the Rhine Plain in good weather.

In addition, its range of hotels and restaurants alongside a host of cultural attractions make the Central/North Black Forest Nature Park one of the most popular holiday regions in Germany.
World renown spas, culture and a range of sporting and tourist facilities for activities like hiking, mountain biking and winter sports add to its popularity.

See also 
 List of nature parks in Germany
 Southern Black Forest Nature Park 
Black Forest National Park

External links 
 Website of the Central/North Black Forest Nature Park (in German)

References 

Black Forest
Black Forest Centre North
Hiking trails in Baden-Württemberg